Taiwan maintains a stable industrial economy as a result of economic growth and industrialization during the late 20th century, being dubbed as one of the Four Asian Tigers along with Hong Kong, Singapore and South Korea. It is a member of both the World Trade Organization and the Asia-Pacific Economic Cooperation. The 21st-largest economy in the world, its high-tech industry plays a key role in the global economy.

Largest firms 

This list shows firms in the Fortune Global 500, which ranks firms by total revenues reported before 31 March 2019.

Notable firms 
This list includes notable companies with primary headquarters located in the country. The industry and sector follow the Industry Classification Benchmark taxonomy. Organizations which have ceased operations are included and noted as defunct.

See also 

 List of airlines of Taiwan
 List of Taiwanese automakers
 List of banks in Taiwan
 Economy of Taiwan

References

External links
 

Taiwan

Companies
Companies